Bonlez Castle is a castle in Bonlez in the municipality of Chaumont-Gistoux, Walloon Brabant, Wallonia, Belgium.

See also
List of castles in Belgium

Sources
 BelgianCastles.br: Bonlez

References
Images of Bonlez Castle

Castles in Belgium
Castles in Walloon Brabant
Chaumont-Gistoux